Juan Apolonio Vairo Moramarco (born April 10, 1932 in Rosario) is a retired Argentine professional football player.

His older brother Federico Vairo played for the Argentina national football team. In the summer of 1965 he played in the Eastern Canada Professional Soccer League with Montreal Italica.

After retiring as a player he went on to become a football manager, coaching Universitario de Oriente in Venezuela in the 1970s.

Honours
Boca Juniors
 Primera División Argentina champion: 1954.
Champion Club Atletico River Plate 1957/58
Champion Rosario Central Division "B" 1951 
AFA (Asociacion Futbol Argentino) 54 games, 17 goals

References

External links
 Juan Vairo at BDFA.com.ar 
 Profile at Historia de Boca 
 Biography at Il Pallone Racconta 

1932 births
Living people
Footballers from Rosario, Santa Fe
Argentine footballers
Argentine expatriate footballers
Argentine expatriate sportspeople in Colombia
Expatriate footballers in Italy
Argentine expatriate sportspeople in Italy
Expatriate footballers in Uruguay
Argentine expatriate sportspeople in Uruguay
Expatriate footballers in Colombia
Argentine Primera División players
Categoría Primera A players
Rosario Central footballers
Boca Juniors footballers
Serie A players
Juventus F.C. players
Club Atlético River Plate footballers
Liverpool F.C. (Montevideo) players
Independiente Medellín footballers
Deportes Quindío footballers
Club Atlético Tigre footballers
Expatriate soccer players in Canada
Association football midfielders
Argentine people of Italian descent
Argentine expatriate sportspeople in Canada
Eastern Canada Professional Soccer League players